Katie Morrow (born 20 September 1999) is a 4.5 point British wheelchair basketball player who was the youngest player selected for Team GB wheelchair basketball team at the 2016 Summer Paralympics in Rio de Janeiro.

Biography
Katie Morrow was born on 20 September 1999. She has an older brother. She is from County Antrim in Northern Ireland. She attended Cullybackey College.

As a swimmer she broke the Irish record in her age group in the freestyle relay event in 2012. She was introduced to wheelchair basketball in 2013 by Phil Robinson, the Wheelchair Basketball Performance Officer at Disability Sport Northern Ireland. She was soon playing in the Lord's Taverners Junior League, the BWB National Leagues, the National Junior Championships, the Celtic Cup, and Sainsbury's School Games. , she is a 4.5 point player, who plays for the Sheffield Steelers in the Women's League and Knights WBC in the National League.

Morrow made her debut with the senior national team at the Continental Clash in 2015, and later that year made her international debut as part of the U25 team at the 2015 Women's U25 Wheelchair Basketball World Championship in Beijing, where it won gold. This was followed by the European Wheelchair Basketball Championship in Worcester, where Great Britain won bronze, and the 2016 Osaka Cup, where it won silver. She won the Mid and East Antrim Borough Council Junior Sportsperson of the Year award in March 2016, and in May 2016, she was named as part of Team GB for the 2016 Summer Paralympics in Rio de Janeiro. At 16, she was the youngest player on the team.  The British team produced its best ever performance at the Paralympics, making it all the way to the semi-finals, but lost to the semi-final to the United States, and then the bronze medal match to the Netherlands.

Achievements
 2015: Gold at the 2015 Women's U25 Wheelchair Basketball World Championship (Beijing, China)
 2015: Bronze at the European Championships (Worcester, England)

References

External links
 

Paralympic wheelchair basketball players of Great Britain
1999 births
Living people
British women's basketball players
Wheelchair basketball players at the 2016 Summer Paralympics
Sportspeople from County Antrim
British women's wheelchair basketball players
21st-century British women